Chrysotypus dawsoni is a species of moth of the family Thyrididae.

It is found in Togo, Cameroon, Sierra Leone, Uganda, Tanzania and South Africa.

The body of this species is red brown, and the underside of the thorax is whitish. The wings are yellow brown with irregular dark brown lines with a wingspan of 34–48 mm.

References

Thyrididae
Moths described in 1897
Moths of Africa
Insects of Uganda
Insects of Tanzania